The 2013 Dalian Aerbin F.C. season is the fourth season in club history, and the second season in the Chinese Super League.

Overview
Before the season started, Aerbin tried to take over Dalian Shide F.C. after its downfall, after the local rival faced difficulties concerning political issue (see Xu Ming, owner of Dalian Shide for the time), but was eventually called off by the CFA.

Aerbin signed former football player Xu Hong as their manager in December 2012, but he resigned after only 62 days, because he was suspended by the CFA for manipulation match results years ago. Li Ming stepped up as the caretaker, before the team signed contract with Serbian manager Simo Krunić in June.

Squad

Technical Staff

Chinese Super League

League table

Results summary

League fixtures and results

Chinese FA Cup

References

Dalian Professional F.C. seasons
Dalian Aerbin F.C.